The 53rd Fighter Squadron "Warhawks" is a squadron of the Romanian Air Force, first formed on 1 June 1940, then reactivated on 29 September 2016. The squadron currently operates the F-16AM/BM fighter aircraft.

History

1940 - 1941
The group consisted of the 53rd Squadron (equipped with the Hawker Hurricane) and 57th Squadron (equipped with Messerschmitt Bf-109E-3). The 7th Fighter Group, at that time, was the best equipped Romanian Air Force unit.

The first deployment of 7th Group, took place on 11 June 1940, on the airfield of Florești. After Romania joined the Axis in the autumn of 1940, a German military mission arrived in the country. It included a German fighter group (I./JG 28), which started to fly training missions with the pilots of the 7th Fighter Group. On 10 October 1940, the 53rd Squadron moved to the Câmpia Turzii aerodrome, where it remained until 5 November. In November 1940, the instruction courses of the Romanian pilots with the Germans started on the Pipera airfield.

On 21 June 1941, one day before the start of the campaign, the 53rd Squadron was redeployed on the Buzău aerodrome, from where it was to accompany the Romanian bombers. However, a pilot of the 53rd Squadron remained on the Mamaia aerodrome, Lieutenant Horia Agarici, whose plane was under repair. In the hangars from Mamaia there was a second Hurricane, also under repair. The latter, having problems with engine overheating and could not be used in flight for long periods.

On 22 June 1941, the 53rd Squadron accompanied 10 PZL.37 Łoś bombers that attacked the airfield of Cetatea Albă. The pilots of the squadron managed to shoot down 4 enemy aircraft, with the loss of 2 bombers to ground fire. A day later Constanța was attacked by Ilyushin DB-3 bombers. After the first wave of bombers managed to hit the port, Lt. Horia Agarici took off in the Hurricane with the engine overheating problems and managed to shoot down 3 bombers of the second wave before having to disengage in order to avoid destroying his engine. The same day, the squadron returned to Mamaia, and managed to shoot down a further 2 DB-3s.

The defense of Dobrogea continued. Lieutenant Constantin "Bâzu" Cantacuzino was credited with a probable victory on 2 July 1941. The 53rd Squadron was visited and congratulated by General Ion Antonescu for the 25 victories obtained in five days of effective fighting. In the first 10 days of fighting, the pilots of the squadron obtained 32 confirmed and 3 unconfirmed victories, with no losses.

On 15 September 1941, a Hurricane patrol took off to accompany the airplane of Marshal Ion Antonescu, which was traveling to Nikolayev, where the funeral of General Eugen von Schobert, commander of the German 11th Army, was taking place. Once there, the Hurricane patrol flew over the funeral procession.

The number of air victories at the end of 1941 was 52 aircraft, with a single loss in battle.

1942 - 1944
During 1942, the 53rd Squadron did not take part in further fighting on the Eastern Front. The squadron, which had been equipped with the Hawker Hurricane Mk. I, started converting to the IAR-80. Later it converted again to the Bf-109E, finally being equipped with Bf-109G fighters. The squadron left the 5th Fighter Group and was assigned to the joint German-Romanian unit I./JG 4 at Mizil, near Ploiești. The squadron was called 4./JG 4 by the Germans. During Operation Tidal Wave on 1 August 1943, the 53rd Squadron was credited with downing two B-24 bombers.

In 1944, the squadron was integrated back into the 7th Fighter Group. On 19 April, the 7th Fighter Group (with the 53rd and 57th Squadrons) was transferred on the front in Moldavia, under the command of the 1st Air Corps. On 22 April they started to fly missions in the Târgu Frumos area. On 15 December 1944, the 53rd Squadron was disbanded, together with the 56th and 57th Squadrons and the command of the 1st Fighter Flotilla.

2016 - present
The 53rd Fighter Squadron was reactivated on 29 September 2016, with the arrival of the first F-16s from Portugal. During 2017 the first pilots got their IOC meaning the unit could start taking part in NATO air patrolling missions. In 2018 tasks were further expanded to include the full variety of tasks the F-16 can perform. The squadron received its 17th F-16 on 25 March 2021.

On 24 February 2022, the starting day of the Russian invasion of Ukraine, two F-16s intercepted a Sukhoi Su-27 of the Ukrainian Air Force that was approaching Romanian airspace. The Su-27 was escorted to the 95th Air Base in Bacău.

Further reading

See also
List of Romanian Air Force units

References

Romanian Air Force
Military history of Romania during World War II
Military units and formations established in 1940